Tristach is a municipality in the district of Lienz in the Austrian state of Tyrol.

Geography
The municipal area stretches from the Drava valley and the suburbs of Lienz southwards up to the Große Sandspitze mountain and the crest of the Gailtal Alps (Lienz Dolomites), the border with Carinthia. It comprises Tristacher See, the only bathing lake in East Tyrol.

Population

References

External links

Cities and towns in Lienz District